Mkaika is a constituency of the National Assembly of Zambia. It covers Katete and Mpoto in Katete District of Eastern Province.

List of MPs

References

Constituencies of the National Assembly of Zambia
1968 establishments in Zambia
Constituencies established in 1968